Henry Crosby Emery (21 December 1872 in Ellsworth, Maine – 6 February 1924) was an American economist.

Biography
In 1892 he graduated from Bowdoin College and later studied at Harvard, Columbia and Berlin. From 1894 to 1900, he was instructor and professor of political economy at Bowdoin, and from 1901 to 1909 he was professor of political economy at Yale. In 1909 he was made chairman of the United States Tariff Board, but returned to his chair at Yale in 1913.

Family
Emery was the son of Maine politician and judge Lucilius A. Emery.

Works
 (1896). Speculation on the Stock and Produce Exchanges of the United States.
 (1910). The Tariff Board and Its Work.
 (1911). The Work of the Tariff Board in Connection with the Cotton Industry.
 (1913). Politician, Party and People.
 (1914). Some Economic Aspects of War.

Notes

References

External links
 
 Works of Henry C. Emery, at JSTOR

1872 births
1924 deaths
American economists
Bowdoin College alumni
Bowdoin College faculty
Yale University faculty
Harvard University alumni
Columbia University alumni